Arthur C. Clarke (1917–2008) was a British science fiction writer, inventor and futurist.

Arthur Clarke may also refer to:
Sir Arthur Clarke, 6th Baronet (1715–1806) of the Clarke baronets
Arthur Clarke (priest) (1848–1932), Archdeacon of Lancaster and of Rochdale
Artie Clarke (1865–1949), American professional baseballist
Arthur Grenfell Clarke (1906–1993), government minister in Hong Kong
Arthur A. Clarke (1917–2009), Jesuit translator of Gauss' Disquisitiones Arithmeticae
Arthur Clarke (sport shooter) (1921–2014), British sport shooter

See also
Arthur Clark (disambiguation)
Arthur Childs-Clarke (1905–1980), English cricketer
Clarke, a surname

References